Tony Hakaoro (5 January 1964 - 1 September 2017) was a Cook Islands broadcaster and radio talk show host. Hakaoro hosted one of the country's most popular, daily radio talk shows, "Karangaranga," on Radio Cook Islands. He was known to publicly criticize Cook Islander politicians on his shows, which earned him a loyal audience.

Hakaoro died on 1 September 2017, following a massive stroke and subsequent coma. He was buried in Titikaveka on 7 September 2017. The Office of the Prime Minister issued a statement calling Hakaoro a "formidable warrior."

References

Date of birth unknown
Year of birth unknown
1964 births
2017 deaths
Cook Island broadcasters
Cook Island radio personalities